Allodesmus is an extinct genus of pinniped from the middle to late Miocene of California and Japan that belongs to the extinct pinniped family Desmatophocidae.

Description and biology

Allodesmus had the specific anatomical features found in modern polygynous pinnipeds: sexual dimorphism, strong canines for fights between bulls and teeth with well-defined growth zones, a result from periodic fasting (in order to defend their harem, males would not take to the sea to feed during the breeding season).

Taxonomy

Allodesmus sinanoensis and A. packardi were previously assigned separate genera, Megagomphos and Brachyallodesmus, respectively, but many authors questioned this generic distinction, and the cladistic analysis by Boessenecker and Churchill (2018) found no support for this generic scheme. Atopotarus, referred to Allodesmus by some authors (e.g. Mitchell 1966), is distinct from Allodesmus by the absence of a prenarial shelf and M2, double-rooted cheek teeth, a small, triangular postorbital process, and a mastoid process projecting ventral to the postglenoid process.

References 

 Encyclopedia of Marine Mammals, ed. William F. Perrin, Bernd Würsig, J.G.M. Thewissen

External links

Miocene pinnipeds
Fossils of Japan
Fossils of the United States
Fossil taxa described in 1922
Miocene California
Prehistoric carnivoran genera